Kotlyarov (feminine: Kotlyarova) is a Russian-language surname, a patronymic derivation from the occupation kotlyar, tinker/tinsmith, similar to the surname Calderon. The surname may refer to:

Aleksandr Kotlyarov (born 1983), Russian football player
Alyaksandr Katlyaraw (born 1993), Belarusian football player
Aleksandra Kotlyarova (born 1988), Uzbekistani triple jumper
Aleksei Kotlyarov (born 1989), Russian football player 
Nadezhda Kotlyarova (born 1989), Russian sprinter
Olga Kotlyarova (born 1976), Russian runner
Yaroslav Kotlyarov (born 1997), Ukrainian football player

Occupational surnames
Patronymic surnames

Russian-language surnames